Te Motu o Umurua is one of 11 islands in the Rakahanga atoll of the Cook Islands. It is on the east of the atoll, next to the island of Tetukono.

References

Rakahanga